Shtiqën is a village and a former municipality in Kukës County, Albania. At the 2015 local government reform it became a subdivision of the municipality Kukës. The population at the 2011 census was 3,438. The municipal unit consists of the following villages:

 Shtiqën
 Krenxë
 Lumë
 Gjalicë
Kukës International Airport Zayed-North Wings is located in Shtiqen, Kukes, Kukes.

References

Former municipalities in Kukës County
Administrative units of Kukës
Villages in Kukës County